Kidstuff could refer to:

 Kidstuff, a 1970s Canadian TV series.
 Kid Stuff, a science fiction short story by American writer Isaac Asimov